A Woman's Guide to Survival is the eighth studio album by Swedish singer and songwriter Miss Li, released in 2017 through Sony Music Sweden.

Reception

Natasha Azarmi of Aftonbladet wrote of the album that Li's "strength is even clearer. She sounds fearless, stubborn and determined. Now it's the anger that carries her forward. The tangible joy that has previously been a sign is only heard on a few occasions."

Track listing

Personnel
 Linda Karlsson – vocals, piano
 Sonny Gustafsson – production
 Lasse Mårtén – mixing, engineering 
 Aryan Marzban – mixing 
 Tom Coyne – engineering

Charts

References

2017 albums
Miss Li albums
Sony Music albums